is a Japanese visual novel developed by Lillian, and was originally released as an adult game for Windows on September 26, 2008. The gameplay in Twinkle Crusaders follows a linear plot line, which offers pre-determined scenarios and courses of interaction, and focuses on the appeal of the five female main characters.

Twinkle Crusaders has also been adapted into four manga adaptations: a four-panel comic strip adaptation was serialized in the bishōjo magazine Dengeki Hime, a second adaptation was serialized irregularly in Dengeki Daioh and concluded with four chapters, an adult one-shot manga chapter was published in the adult magazine Megastore, and a fourth adaptation entitled Twinkle Crusaders GoGo! was serialized in Dengeki Daioh.

Plot

Unfortunately there's no such thing as a free meal.

Gameplay
Twinkle Crusaders is a combination of visual novel and turn-based strategy game.  The novel portion consists of large amounts of often comedic conversations between characters, based on selections the player makes.  There are also a lot of Easter eggs hidden within the game that can be discovered by choosing certain options during gameplay.  The battle portion of the game consists of turn-based "scenes" where the player must reduce the opponent's Hit Points (HP) to zero using various battle strategies.  In order to proceed with the story, the player must successfully defeat the enemy.

Development
Twinkle Crusaders was first announced as the first project to be developed by the visual novel developer Lillian in the Japanese bishōjo magazine Tech Gian, on November 21, 2006. Art direction and character designs were provided by Rei Kannagi and Kotamaru who assisted Kannagi in the process. While the scenario in the game was worked on by Shigeta and Hideto Mayura, with Hozumi Nakamoto who provided assistance in the preparation of the story. The music in the game was composed entirely by Amedio. With the exception of Hozumi Nakamoto, the entire development team has previously worked on previous titles developed by Pajamas Soft, such as Prism Ark.

Release
Before the game's release, three game demos were distributed online at the visual novel's official website, while a separate demo were distributed at retail stores. The demos gave the player a glimpse into the characters and the story of the game, and also introduced the player to the gameplay system, typically the battle system used in the game. The full game was first released on September 26, 2008, as both a limited edition and a premium edition. The limited edition release included the game itself, an arrange album titled Kira-kira Sound Festival, an art collection by twelve different artists, and a clear plastic casing. The premium edition release included the extras found in the limited edition release along with a silver necklace, and is limited to one-thousand units. An all-ages version entitled Twinkle Crusaders GoGo! was released for the PlayStation Portable published by ASCII Media Works on September 9, 2010, and contains additional content not found in the original release, namely a new heroine and promoting a sub heroine to heroine status.
A release for windows 7 named Twinkled Crusader Remaster was released on 24 June 2010, since this was released before Twinkled Crusaders GoGo!, it does not contain the extra content from it.

Internet radio show
An internet radio show to promote the Twinkle Crusaders, titled  was first streamed online on August 27, 2008, as a pre-broadcast episode. It began its regular broadcast on September 10, 2008, and was streamed online bi-weekly on Mondays. The radio show is hosted by Kimiko Koyama and Shizuka Itō, who voiced Melilot and Herena in the visual novel, and is produced by Onsen.

Manga
Before the game's release, a four-panel comic strip manga adaptation was serialized in ASCII Media Works' bishōjo magazine Dengeki Hime between the December 2007 and October 2008 issues sold on October 30, 2007, and August 30, 2008, respectively. The story of the manga is based on the visual novel, despite it not having been released yet, and was illustrated by Japanese illustrator Kotamaru, who has also contributed to the art in the game. A second manga adaptation was serialized irregularly between the April 2008 and August 2008 issues of Dengeki Daioh, published by ASCII Media Works on February 21 and June 21, 2008, respectively, and concluded with four chapters. The second manga was illustrated by Jin Arima, and unlike the first manga which is inspired from the visual novel, the story of the second manga's story is instead based on the game's storyline. A one-shot manga chapter was also serialized in the adult magazine Megastore on May 17, 2008. The manga chapter was drawn by Yasushi Kawakami, and contained adult content not found in the other two manga adaptations. A fourth manga adaptation entitled Twinkle Crusaders GoGo! began serialization in Dengeki Daioh July 2009 issue on May 27, 2009, and was illustrated by Hijiki and in October 2010.

Reception and sales
From mid-February to mid-March, the limited edition of Twinkle Crusaders was the eighth most pre-ordered title, according to a Japanese national ranking of PC games. It was then ranked as the most pre-ordered title in Japan from mid-March to mid-April, the fifth from mid-April to mid-May. The game was also the second most pre-ordered game from mid-May to mid-June, only falling behind Little Busters! Ecstasy, after which the game was again placed as the most pre-ordered title in Japan for two consecutive months.

References

External links
Official Twinkle Crusaders PC visual novel website 
Official Twinkle Crusaders PSP visual novel website 

2007 manga
2008 manga
2008 video games
2009 manga
ASCII Media Works games
ASCII Media Works manga
Kadokawa Dwango franchises
Bishōjo games
Dengeki Daioh
Drama anime and manga
Eroge
Fantasy anime and manga
Japan-exclusive video games
PlayStation Portable games
Romance anime and manga
Romance video games
Seinen manga
Video games developed in Japan
Visual novels
Windows games